A bedrock mortar (BRM) is an  anthropogenic circular depression in a rock outcrop or naturally occurring slab, used by people in the past for grinding of grain, acorns or other food products.  There are often a cluster of a considerable number of such holes in proximity indicating that people gathered in groups to conduct food grinding in prehistoric cultures. Correspondingly the alternative name gossip stone is sometimes applied, indicating the social context of the food grinding activity.  Typical dimensions of the circular indentations are approximately 12 centimeters in diameter by 10 centimeters deep, although a considerable range of depths of the cavities have been documented . The bedrock mortar has been identified in a number of world regions, but has been particularly intensely documented in the Americas.  An alternative term for the bedrock mortar site is bedrock milling station.

Bedrock metate
A bedrock mortar should not be confused with a bedrock metate, which is a flat, trough-shaped depression often found with bedrock mortars.

Example locations of occurrence
Southern Arizona: In the Santa Catalina, Santa Rita, Rincon, Sierrita, and Tucson Mountains, and also in rock outcroppings in the valleys
Along the north banks of the middle reaches of  the Merced River in Mariposa County, California, United States
In Santa Barbara and San Luis Obispo counties on the California Central Coast 
In northern Mexico within the Sierra Tarahumara of Southern Chihuahua
The Upper Cumberland Plateau of Tennessee, United States
Inside many rock shelters in Menifee County, Kentucky, United States
The Cueva de los Corrales region of northwestern Argentina

Gallery

See also
 Grinding slab
 Mano
 Metate
 Mortar and pestle

Line note references

Food preparation utensils
Archaeological features
Food grinding tools